Jack Whitehead (17 June 1913 – 14 July 1986) was an  Australian rules footballer who played with St Kilda in the Victorian Football League (VFL).

Notes

External links 

1913 births
1986 deaths
Australian rules footballers from Victoria (Australia)
St Kilda Football Club players
Prahran Football Club players